Parliamentary elections were held in Greece on 9 September 1951. They resulted in an ambivalent outcome, consisting a narrow and pyrrhic, as proven later, victory for the ruling center-liberal parties of Sophoklis Venizelos and Nikolaos Plastiras.

Background
After the Greek elections of 1950, when the divided centrist parties had a clear majority in the Parliament political instability was the main characteristic of the political life in Greece. The subsequent centre-liberal governments of Sophoklis Venizelos, Nikolaos Plastiras and Georgios Papandreou did not manage to ensure and enforce stability. As a result, Nikolaos Plastiras supported a People's Party government, under the terms that the latter would soon conduct elections.

Outcome
First party in the elections of 1951 was the just-founded Greek Rally of Alexandros Papagos, which swept the traditionally dominant right-wing People's Party. Nevertheless, the two major centrist-liberal parties, the Liberal Party and the National Progressive Center Union, elected more deputies than the conservatives.

The left-wing EDA, a party believed to have been affiliated with the outlaw during 1950-1974 Communist Party of Greece, made its first appearance in these elections.

Results

Aftermath
Since no party or alliance had the absolute majority in the Parliament and Alexandros Papagos refused to participate in a government of national unity, the Liberal Party and the National Progressive Center Union formed a minority government under the leadership of Nikolaos Plastiras, which lasted for about a year, since 1952, when Nikolaos Plastiras submitted his resignation and new legislative elections were proclaimed by the King Paul I.

References

Parliamentary elections in Greece
Legislative election
Greece
1950s in Greek politics
Greece
Legl